CHNO may refer to:

CHNO-FM
CHNO, the chemical formula of several compounds
Cyanic acid
Isocyanic acid
Fulminic acid
Isofulminic acid